Muhammad Zhafir bin Mohd Yusoff (born 30 April 1999) is Malaysian professional footballer who plays as a midfielder for Kedah Darul Aman.

References

External links
 

1999 births
Living people
People from Kedah
Malaysian footballers
Association football midfielders
Kedah Darul Aman F.C. players
Malaysia Super League players